In mathematics, the Schottky problem, named after Friedrich Schottky, is a classical question of algebraic geometry, asking for a characterisation of Jacobian varieties amongst abelian varieties.

Geometric formulation
More precisely, one should consider algebraic curves  of a given genus , and their Jacobians . There is a moduli space  of such curves, and a moduli space of abelian varieties, of dimension , which are principally polarized. The content of Torelli's theorem is that  is injective (again, on points).

This means that the dimensions are the same (0, 1, 3, 6) for g = 0, 1, 2, 3. Therefore  is the first case where the dimensions change, and this was studied by F. Schottky in the 1880s. A more precise form of the question is to determine whether the image of  essentially coincides with the Schottky locus (in other words, whether it is Zariski dense there).

Dimension 1 case 

Dimensions 2 and 3 
In the case of Abelian surfaces, there are two types of Abelian varieties: the Jacobian of a genus 2 curve, or the product of Jacobians of elliptic curves. This means the moduli spacesembed into . There is a similar description for dimension 3 since an Abelian variety can be the product of Jacobians.

Period lattice formulation

If one describes the moduli space  in intuitive terms, as the parameters on which an abelian variety depends, then the Schottky problem asks simply what condition on the parameters implies that the abelian variety comes from a curve's Jacobian. The classical case, over the complex number field, has received most of the attention, and then an abelian variety A is simply a complex torus of a particular type, arising from a lattice in Cg. In relatively concrete terms, it is being asked which lattices are the period lattices of compact Riemann surfaces.

Riemann's matrix formulation
Note that a Riemann matrix is quite different from any Riemann tensor

One of the major achievements of Bernhard Riemann was his theory of complex tori and theta functions. Using the Riemann theta function, necessary and sufficient conditions on a lattice were written down by Riemann for a lattice in Cg to have the corresponding torus embed into complex projective space. (The interpretation may have come later, with Solomon Lefschetz, but Riemann's theory was definitive.) The data is what is now called a Riemann matrix. Therefore the complex Schottky problem becomes the question of characterising the period matrices of compact Riemann surfaces of genus g, formed by integrating a basis for the abelian integrals round a basis for the first homology group, amongst all Riemann matrices. It was solved by Takahiro Shiota in 1986.

Geometry of the problem

There are a number of geometric approaches, and the question has also been shown to implicate the Kadomtsev–Petviashvili equation, related to soliton theory.

See also 

 Moduli of abelian varieties

References

Algebraic curves
Abelian varieties
Theta functions